The 1929 Wyoming Cowboys football team was an American football team that represented the University of Wyoming as a member of the Rocky Mountain Conference during the 1929 college football season. In their third season under head coach George McLaren, the Cowboys compiled a 1–7 record (0–7 against conference opponents), finished last out of 12 teams in the RMC, and were outscored by a total of 160 to 33.

Schedule

References

Wyoming
Wyoming Cowboys football seasons
Wyoming Cowboys football